Michael Pointer is a fictional character code-named Omega, a mutant appearing in American comic books published by Marvel Comics. He first appeared in New Avengers #16 (April 2006) as the Collective before becoming a member of the Omega Flight team.

Fictional character biography
Pointer worked as a mail carrier in North Pole, Alaska, not knowing he was a mutant with the ability to absorb the energy, abilities, and even personalities of other mutants. He inadvertently became the focal point of the mutant energy displaced after the Decimation event, which had previously hovered above Earth, maintaining the disembodied mind of the deceased mutant Xorn, amongst others. After absorbing the energy, Pointer became the being known as the Collective. With his body possessed by Xorn's consciousness, Pointer went on a rampage across North America, killing over 2,000 people. Upon entering Canada, the Collective killed most of the original members of Alpha Flight. In Cleveland, outside the Rock and Roll Hall of Fame, he faced Iron Man, Ms. Marvel and the Sentry in battle.  Through that encounter, Spider-Man and the Vision, with the assistance of S.H.I.E.L.D., were able to determine the nature of his powers.

The Collective went to Genosha and began to transfer its powers to the recently depowered Magneto. After the ensuing battle between Magneto and the Collective (still under Xorn's influence) and the New Avengers, Pointer still possessed a large amount of residual energy. After the super-hero Civil War, he was forced to join Omega Flight as a means of atoning for the damage he caused while being the Collective.

As a member of Omega Flight, Pointer wore a suit designed by Reed Richards to regulate his mutant absorption powers. During Omega Flight's first mission, Pointer aided the group against the combined forces of the Wrecking Crew and the Great Beast known as Tanaraq. After the battle, Sasquatch apologizes for forcing Richards' suit onto Michael, instructing him to avoid dwelling on the past and to instead do right by the Guardian-styled uniform and the nation it represents. Pointer also gains the forgiveness of Talisman, who realizes Pointer is truly remorseful for the indirect role he played in the Alpha Flight incident.

Under the code name of Weapon Omega, Pointer next appeared in the ongoing Marvel Comics Presents (2007) series, which lasted 12-issues. The Canadian government was using Pointer in a Weapon Omega project, in which villains captured by Omega Flight were used to provide Pointer with energy, as his Collective energy was beginning to trail off. The source of the energy was unknown to Pointer and the other members of Omega Flight. The government would also use Mutant Growth Hormone to pump up the criminals' powers and make their DNA more compatible to Pointer's, while using the Guardian suit to regulate the flow (the use of Pointer's absorption powers on these criminals was fatal). This caused Pointer to become an addict of the energy, and only with the help of the other members of Omega Flight was he able to put a stop to the government plans.  At the end of this series he rejected his role in Omega Flight.

He also appeared in Incredible Hercules #117 in a flashback scene where he asked Snowbird to join Omega Flight. She violently refused, since he killed her former teammates as the Collective and was now wearing a suit similar to the original Guardian's uniform.

Weapon Omega was recruited to join Emma Frost's "Dark X-Men". Norman Osborn gets Omega to join his X-Men to 'atone' for all the deaths he helped cause. Osborn attempts to use a device created by Dark Beast (an alternate reality version of Henry McCoy) to siphon powers away from mutants and place them into Pointer. Pointer seems to develop an addiction to this, constantly yelling that he needs "more juice" during his power ups from the device. Pointer's uniform stopped looking like the Guardian suit and he would drop Weapon from his code name. After the reshuffle of Osborn's X-Men, the power-ups are shown to be affecting Pointer's psyche where it seems remnants of the personalities of the mutants he is draining energy from seep into his mind.

After Osborn was taken down by the Avengers during the Siege storyline, Mimic and Weapon Omega left H.A.M.M.E.R. but Weapon Omega's powers started acting up. Mimic went to Hank McCoy for help, as he had been the only person who had always aided him when he needed help. Mimic took Weapon Omega to the Xavier Institute where Beast found out that Weapon Omega was about to explode. The X-Men tried various ways to prevent the explosion. But in the end, the only way left outside of death was an induced artificial coma. Weapon Omega asked his only friend to do it and Mimic complied. Borrowing powers from Rachel Grey, Mimic put Omega to sleep promising to stay by his side until he wakes up.

Powers and abilities
Michael Pointer is a mutant with the ability to absorb the energy, personalities and abilities of other mutants. He must be near the mutant, but does not need touch.  His absorption results in a commensurate loss of ability in his victims.  He wears a suit designed to focus absorbed energies into flight, durability, and energy blasts, but would otherwise demonstrate the same mutant powers he has absorbed.  

He is limited by guilt, inexperience with various mutant powers, a lack of confidence and the confusion caused by absorbing strong personalities or many personalities.    

As the Collective, he contained the inherent power of almost every mutant on the planet.  When Mimic copied Michael's absorption ability, the two of them were able to completely neutralize X-Man.

References

External links
 AlphaFlight.net Alphanex Entry on Guardian IV

Fictional United States Postal Service workers
Fictional characters from Alaska
Fictional characters with superhuman durability or invulnerability
Marvel Comics supervillains
Marvel Comics mutants
Comics characters introduced in 2006
Fictional mass murderers
Characters created by Brian Michael Bendis
X-Men supporting characters
People from North Pole, Alaska